The 2023 IBSF World Championships were held in St. Moritz, Switzerland from 26 January to 5 February 2023. For the first time, para-bobsleigh events were included.

Schedule
Eight events were held.

All times are local (UTC+1).

Bobsleigh

Skeleton

Medal summary

Medal table

Bobsleigh

Skeleton

See also
IBSF European Championships 2023
IBSF Junior World Championships 2023

References

External links
Official website

 
IBSF
2023 in Swiss sport
2023 in bobsleigh
2023 in skeleton
Bobsleigh in Switzerland
Skeleton in Switzerland
January 2023 sports events in Switzerland
February 2023 sports events in Switzerland